Ghana is represented at the 2006 Commonwealth Games in Melbourne by a xx-member strong contingent comprising xx sportspersons and xx officials.

Medals

Gold
 Majeti Fetrie — Weightlifting, Men's – 77 kg
 Ignisious Gaisah — Athletics, Men's Long Jump

Silver
None

Bronze
 Awusone Yekeni — Boxing, Men's Heavyweight (– 91 kg)

Ghana at the Commonwealth Games
Nations at the 2006 Commonwealth Games
Commonwealth Games